is a Japanese football player. She plays for Nojima Stella in the Nadeshiko League Division 1. She played for Japan national team.

Club career
Nakano was born in Hokkaido on August 30, 1986. After graduating from high school, she joined Ohara Gakuen JaSRA (later AC Nagano Parceiro) in 2005. In 2007, she moved to Okayama Yunogo Belle and she played in 8 season. In 2015, she moved to Vegalta Sendai (later Mynavi Vegalta Sendai). In July 2017, she returned to AC Nagano Parceiro.

National team career
On January 13, 2010, Nakano debuted for Japan national team against Denmark. She was a member of Japan for 2010 Asian Games and Japan won the championship. She played 12 games and scored 2 goals for Japan until 2013.

National team statistics

International goals

References

External links

AC Nagano Parceiro

1986 births
Living people
Association football people from Hokkaido
Japanese women's footballers
Japan women's international footballers
Nadeshiko League players
AC Nagano Parceiro Ladies players
Okayama Yunogo Belle players
Mynavi Vegalta Sendai Ladies players
Asian Games gold medalists for Japan
Asian Games medalists in football
Women's association football midfielders
Footballers at the 2010 Asian Games
Medalists at the 2010 Asian Games